Branislav Trajković (born 29 August 1989) is a Serbian footballer who plays as a centre-back for Radnički Beograd.

Club career

Early career
Having been a well-known talent in his teenage years, Trajković made his professional debut for Hajduk Kula at the age of 16 in 2005. From 2005 to 2007 he was loaned out to lower-tier teams Radnički Sombor and POFK Kula. From 2008 he played regularly for Hajduk Kula, becoming a regular starter and gained a reputation as the core centre-back of the entire team.

Vojvodina
Trajković signed for Vojvodina in August 2010. From the beginning of the 2011-12 season he became captain of FK Vojvodina thanks to his reputation as one of the best center-backs playing in the entire league. By the summer of 2012 Trajković had attracted interest from Trabzonspor and S.S. Lazio. On 30 January 2013, despite an offer to sign for Udinese Calcio, Trajković decided to stay with FK Vojvodina in an attempt to be the first captain to lead the team to win the Serbian Cup. In 2013, he began starting games as team captain with greater frequency.

Partizan
On 11 January 2014, after turning down a lucrative offer from Antalyaspor, Trajković signed with Partizan, where he was re-united with coach Marko Nikolić who had previously coached FK Vojvodina. The transfer was just one part of a large controversy on Vojvodina's winter transactions to Partizan in 2014, which caused uproar and severe criticism of football fans and sports journalists.

Zemun
After being without a club for a year, Trajković signed with Zemun on the last day of the summer transfer window 2017 as a single player. He made his debut against Red Star Belgrade on 29 October. On 5 March 2018, it was announced Trajković earned a leg fracture in a match played two days before. Previously, he had been substituted out in 53 minute of game against Javor Ivanjica, being replaced with Slobodan Vuković in 2–0 home defeat.

Isloch
On 30 March 2019, Trajković joined Isloch Minsk Raion. He played one game for the reserve team and was only on the bench for the first team one time, before the club announced on 4 June 2019, that his contract had been terminated by mutual consent.

International career
Trajković was called up for the Serbian national team ahead of the friendly match against Cyprus national football team on 6 February 2013, but did not make his debut in that game. He finally made his debut for the national team on 15 October 2013, in a match against Macedonia.

Career statistics

International

References

External links
 Branislav Trajković Stats at Utakmica.rs
 
 

1989 births
Living people
People from Odžaci
Serbian footballers
Serbia international footballers
Serbian expatriate footballers
Expatriate footballers in Kazakhstan
Expatriate footballers in Belarus
Expatriate footballers in North Macedonia
Association football defenders
Serbian SuperLiga players
Kazakhstan Premier League players
FK Hajduk Kula players
FK Radnički Sombor players
FK Vojvodina players
FK Partizan players
FC Ordabasy players
FK Zemun players
FC Isloch Minsk Raion players
FK Rabotnički players
FK Radnički Beograd players